Paul De Keyser (born 7 February 1957) is a former Belgian racing cyclist. He rode in the 1980 Tour de France.

References

External links

1957 births
Living people
Belgian male cyclists
People from Aarschot
Cyclists from Flemish Brabant